Lopătari is a commune in Buzău County, Muntenia, Romania. It is composed of eleven villages: Brebu, Fundata, Lopătari, Luncile, Pestrițu, Plaiu Nucului, Ploștina, Potecu, Săreni, Terca and Vârteju.

References

Communes in Buzău County
Localities in Muntenia